Ryan Martin (born 4 September 1993) is a Samoan footballer who plays as a midfielder for Hawke's Bay United FC in the New Zealand Football Championship.

References

1993 births
Living people
Samoan footballers
Association football midfielders
Samoa international footballers
Hawke's Bay United FC players
2016 OFC Nations Cup players